Maryse Paillet born in Limoges and died at an indeterminate date after 1970, was a French singer and actress.

Life 
Virtually nothing is known about Maryse Paillet other than that she first embarked on an operatic career as a soprano soloist from 1926 both on stage and on the airwaves before turning to the theatre after the Liberation of France and to the big and small screen in the very early 1950s.

Her trail is lost after a final role in Mauregard, a television series broadcast in October–November 1970 on the second channel of the ORTF.

Opera 
 1926: Le Moulin de Javelle, comic opera in 1 act by Paul Henrion, libretto by Ernest Grenet-Dancourt, at the Salle des Fêtes in Armentières (21 March) 
 1928: Messe Saint-Georges, for choir, soloists and orchestra by Georges Ghestem, in the church of Saint-Charles in Lille (15 January)
 1928: Ève, oratorio in 4 parts by Jules Massenet, libretto by Louis Gallet, at the Hippodrome Lillois (13 mai) : Ève.

Theatre 
 1946: La Cinquantaine, popular scene in 1 act by Georges Courteline, directed by Georges Vitaly, Théâtre de Poche Montparnasse (January).
 1946: Amphitryon, 3-act comedy by Molière, setting by Yves Bonnat, Théâtre des Noctambules (24 January)
 1947: L’Ombre d’un franc-tireur, tragic comedy in 2 acts by Seán O'Casey (The Shadow of a Gunman), French adaptation by Philippe Kellerson, directed by André Clavé, Théâtre Tristan-Bernard (12 January).
 1948: Boubouroche / Théodore cherche des allumettes, Les Boulingrin, one-act play by Courteline, directed by André Clavé, Guy Piérauld and Julien Verdier, au Centre dramatique de l'Est in Colmar (January)
 1948: The Government Inspector, comedy in 5 acts by Nikolai Gogol, French adaptation and staging by André Barsacq, Théâtre de l'Atelier (23 November) : Fevronia Petrovna Pochliopkina
 1949: Le Miracle de l'homme pauvre, play in 3 acts and 5 scenes by Marian Hemar, French adaptation by Cécil Robson, directed by André Clavé, Théâtre municipal de Mulhouse (7 December)
 1950: À chacun selon sa faim, play in 3 acts by Jean Mogin, directed by Raymond Hermantier, Théâtre du Vieux-Colombier (17 February)
 1950: Junon et le paon, tragedy in 3 acts by Sean O'Casey (Juno and the Paycock), French adaptation and direction by Philippe Kellerson, Théâtre de l'Œuvre (September).
 1952: Philippe et Jonas, 2-act play by Irwin Shaw (The Gentle People), French adaptation by Marcel Duhamel, directed by Jean-Pierre Grenier, Théâtre de la Gaîté-Montparnasse (20 December) : Angelina Esposito
 1955: Poppi, 2-act comedy by Georges Sonnier, directed by Pierre Valde, Théâtre des Arts (February)
 1955: Le Mariage de Barillon, vaudeville in 3 acts by Georges Feydeau and Maurice Desvallières, directed by René Dupuy, Théâtre Gramont (19 June)

Film 

 1950: Un homme marche dans la ville by Marcello Pagliero - Tantine
 1950: Plus de vacances pour le Bon Dieu by Robert Vernay
 1951: Boîte à vendre by Claude Lalande - short film -
 1950: Justice est faite by André Cayatte
 1950: Under the Sky of Paris by Julien Duvivier - Mme Milou
 1951: Passion by Georges Lampin
 1951: Dupont Barbès by Henri Lepage
 1952: La Maison dans la dune by Georges Lampin
 1952: Monsieur Leguignon Lampiste by Maurice Labro
 1952: Trois femmes by André Michel - La servante
 1952: Brelan d'as by Henri Verneuil - Une concierge
 1952: Nous sommes tous des assassins by André Cayatte
 1952: Piédalu fait des miracles by Jean Loubignac
 1952: Le Banquet des fraudeurs by Henri Storck - Kobi
 1953: Les Compagnes de la nuit by Ralph Habib - L'employée
 1954: Crainquebille by Ralph Habib - Mme Lateigne
 1953: Their Last Night by Georges Lacombe - Marie, la femme du marinier
 1954: Piédalu député by Jean Loubignac
 1954: Le Comte de Monte-Cristo, film en 2 parties de Robert Vernay : Valentine
 1955: Rififi by Jules Dassin - La mère de Charlie
 1955: : Fantaisie d'un jour by Pierre Cardinal
 1955: Les Hommes en blanc, de Ralph Habib - Une paysanne
 1956: Maid in Paris by Pierre Gaspard-Huit
 1955: Sophie et le Crime by Pierre Gaspard-Huit
 1956: Mannequins de Paris by André Hunebelle
 1956: La Traversée de Paris by Claude Autant-Lara - Une femme au restaurant
 1956: Les Truands by Carlo Rim
 1958: Maigret tend un piège by Jean Delannoy - Une bouchère
 1960: Trique, gamin de Paris by Marco de Gastyne
 1962: Tartarin de Tarascon by Francis Blanche and Raoul André - Berthe Fracca
 1963: Tante Aurore viendra ce soir / L'Araignée, short film by Claude Pierson : Mme Baju, la concierge Television 
 1970: Mauregard, television series in 6 episodes by Claude de Givray, episode 1940 : le temps des colères (29 October) : la dame à la messe''

References 

French stage actresses
French film actresses
French television actresses
People from Limoges
Date of birth missing
20th-century French women singers